Viola Township is one of twelve townships in Audubon County, Iowa, United States. As of the 2010 census, its population was 166.

History
Viola Township was organized in 1873.

Geography
According to the USGS, it contains one cemetery, Viola Center.

References

External links
 US-Counties.com
 City-Data.com

Townships in Audubon County, Iowa
Townships in Iowa
1873 establishments in Iowa
Populated places established in 1873